Shepperton Studios is a film studio located in Shepperton, Surrey, England, with a history dating back to 1931. It is now part of the Pinewood Studios Group. During its early existence, the studio was branded as Sound City (not to be confused with the Californian recording studio of the same name).

History

1930s–1960s
Shepperton Studios was built on the grounds of Littleton Park, which was built in the 17th century by local nobleman Thomas Wood. The old mansion still stands on the site.

Scottish businessman Norman Loudon purchased Littleton Park in 1931 for use by his new film company, Sound Film Producing & Recording Studios; the facility opened in 1932. The studios, which produced both short and feature films, expanded rapidly. Proximity to the Vickers-Armstrongs aircraft factory at Brooklands, which attracted German bombers, disrupted filming during the Second World War, as did the requisitioning of the studios in 1941 by the government, who first used it for sugar storage and later to create decoy aircraft and munitions for positioning in the Middle East. The Ministry of Aircraft Production also took over part of the studios for the production of Vickers Wellington bomber components early in the war.

After re-opening in 1945, the studios changed hands. When Sir Alexander Korda purchased British Lion Films, he also acquired a controlling interest in Sound City and Shepperton Studios. Among the films in which he was involved during this period were The Fallen Idol (1948) and The Third Man (1949) which was shot both at the studios and on location and has been referred to as the best British film noir.

In spite of such successes, British Lion ran into financial difficulties in the 1950s when it was unable to repay a 1949 loan from the National Film Finance Corporation and went into receivership on 1 July 1954. In January 1955, a new company, British Lion Films Ltd, was formed and Roy and John Boulting took over at Shepperton Studios. Their comedies, such as I'm All Right Jack (1959), were produced there, as were dramas from other film-makers such as J. Lee Thompson's The Guns of Navarone (1961). The studio's other projects from the same decade include Stanley Kubrick's Dr Strangelove (1964) and the musical Oliver! (1968), which won the Academy Award for Best Picture.

1970s–present

Despite the financial ups and downs of British Lion and the changing of hands, the studios remained active until the early 1970s. In 1969, the studios produced 27 films; by 1971 this number had fallen to seven. Production throughout the 1970s was erratic, reaching a low of two films by 1979. Among the problems faced by Shepperton Studios during this time was the desire of new British Lion director John Bentley to sell the grounds for housing, since redeveloping the land would have nearly doubled its value.

The studios' 1970s credits include Kubrick's A Clockwork Orange and Jimmy Perry and David Croft's Dad's Army (both 1971), Richard Attenborough's Young Winston (1972) and Fred Zinnemann's The Day of the Jackal (1973). Also around this time, the rock group Led Zeppelin filmed some concert scenes at Shepperton that were used in their live concert film, "The Song Remains the Same". These scenes were used to fill gaps in footage of a Madison Square Garden concert from 1973.  

In 1975, the studios were again transferred to new ownership and in spite of sparse production schedules served as the filming site of some high-budget productions, including Richard Donner's The Omen (1976), Franklin Schaffner's The Boys from Brazil (1978), Ridley Scott's Alien (1979), David Lynch's The Elephant Man (1980), Attenborough's Gandhi (1982) and David Lean's A Passage to India (1984). In 1978, rock band The Who filmed live concert scenes at Shepperton for their documentary The Kids Are Alright (1979). These turned out to be the band's final live performance with drummer Keith Moon, who died later that year.

In 1984, Shepperton Studios changed hands coming under the control of brothers John and Benny Lee, who renovated the studios but soon lost control as a result of the "Black Monday" of 1987, the 1988 Writers Guild of America strike and internal issues within their company, Lee International. Bankers Warburg Pincus acquired the studios, which became busy with the filming of TV shows including Thomas & Friends and its sister series, TUGS, as well as such films as Franco Zeffirelli's Hamlet (1990), Kevin Reynolds' Robin Hood: Prince of Thieves (1991) and Nicholas Hytner's The Madness of King George (1994). In 1995, the studios were purchased by a consortium headed by Ridley and Tony Scott, which led to an extensive renovation of the studios as well as the expansion and improvement of its grounds.

In 2001, Shepperton Studios was sold to the Pinewood Group, which also owns Pinewood Studios in the UK, as well as Pinewood Studio Berlin in Germany, Pinewood Toronto Studios in Canada, Pinewood Indomina Studios in the Dominican Republic and Pinewood Iskandar Malaysia Studios in Malaysia.

In July 2019, Netflix announced that it would be opening a hub at the studios.

In November 2021, Netflix announced that it would extend its long-term deal with the studios. The studio's owner Pinewood Group also announced that the studios would expend approximately 1 million square feet of the new production space, with the overall studio set to comprise 17 sound stages.

In February 2022, Amazon Prime Video signed a multi-million pound long-term deal with the studios for exclusive use of new production facilities.

Stages and locations
Although often described as the home of independent film and TV production in the UK, the studios have also served as a production base for big-budget films such as Captain America: The First Avenger (2011), the filming for which used eight of the fifteen stages. The British TV series Thomas & Friends was shot on the "T Stage" from 1984 to 2008, after which the live action models originally used were replaced with computer animation.

The nearby Little House and surrounding grounds have been used as a filming location for films such as The Omen (1976) and The Young Victoria (2009). The studios also have two large backlots, which were used to create two castle compounds for the film 47 Ronin.

Selected film credits

Many films have used Shepperton Studios, including (in chronological order):

1930s
Reunion (1932)
The Ghoul (1933)
Menace (1934)
Colonel Blood (1934)
Rolling Home (1935)
Birds of a Feather (1936)
Reasonable Doubt (1936)
Second Bureau (1936)
It's Never Too Late to Mend (1937)

1940s
The Fallen Idol (1948)
The Third Man (1949)
Gone To Earth (1949)

1950s
The Tales of Hoffmann (1951)
The Holly and the Ivy (1952) 
An Inspector Calls (1954)
Richard III (1955)
The End of the Affair (1955)
It's a Wonderful World (1956)
A King in New York (1957)The Passionate Stranger (1957)
Suddenly, Last Summer (1959)
Left, Right and Centre (1959)

1960s
Mysterious Island (1961)
The Innocents (1961)
Lawrence of Arabia (1962)
The Painted Smile (1962)
The Servant (1963)
Dr. Strangelove (1964)
Becket (1964)
The Spy Who Came In from the Cold (1965)
Dr. Who and the Daleks (1965)
The Bedford Incident (1965)
Lord Jim (1965)
Daleks' Invasion Earth 2150 A.D. (1966)
Georgy Girl (1966)
Fathom (1967)
2001: A Space Odyssey (1968)
Oliver! (1968)

1970s
Scrooge (1970)
Dad's Army (1971)
Young Winston (1972)
Psychomania (1973)
The Return of the Pink Panther (1975)
The Omen (1976)
Star Wars (1977)
The Boys from Brazil (1978)
Superman (1978)
Alien (1979)
The Kids Are Alright (1979)
The Martian Chronicles (TV miniseries, 1979)

1980s
The Elephant Man (1980)
Flash Gordon (1980)
Saturn 3 (1980)
Blade Runner (1982)
Gandhi (1982)
The Pirates of Penzance (1983)
A Passage to India (1984)
Out of Africa (1985)
The Princess Bride (1987)
Cry Freedom (1987)
Gorillas in the Mist (1988)
Henry V (1989)

1990s
Hamlet (1990)
Robin Hood: Prince of Thieves (1991)
Chaplin (1992)
The Muppet Christmas Carol (1992)
Four Weddings and a Funeral (1994)
The Madness of King George (1994)
Mary Shelley's Frankenstein (1994)
Judge Dredd (1995)
Restoration (1995)
Sense and Sensibility (1995)
Muppet Treasure Island (1996)
The Wind in the Willows (1996)
Evita (1996)
101 Dalmatians (1996)
G.I. Jane (1997)
The Borrowers  (1997)
Lost in Space (1998)
Shakespeare in Love (1998)
The Mummy (1999)
Notting Hill (1999)
Sleepy Hollow (1999)

2000s

Billy Elliot (2000)
Chocolat (2000)
Gladiator (2000)
Bridget Jones's Diary (2001)
Gosford Park (2001)
Just Visiting (2001)
Spy Game (2001)
The Mummy Returns (2001)
About a Boy (2002)
Bend It Like Beckham (2002)
Dirty Pretty Things (2002)
The Four Feathers (2002)
Love Actually (2003)
The Life of David Gale (2003)
Alexander (2004)
Bridget Jones: The Edge of Reason (2004)
Finding Neverland (2004)
Harry Potter and the Prisoner of Azkaban (2004)
Troy (2004)
Wimbledon (2004)
Batman Begins (2005)
Harry Potter and the Goblet of Fire (2005)
Mrs Henderson Presents (2005)
Sahara (2005)
Star Wars: Episode III – Revenge of the Sith (2005)
The Da Vinci Code (2006)
Atonement (2007)
Elizabeth: The Golden Age (2007)
The Golden Compass (2007)
Doomsday (2008)
Mutant Chronicles (2008)
Cheri (2009)
Inkheart (2009)
Moon (2009)
Nine (2009)
The Boat That Rocked (2009)
The Young Victoria (2009)

2010s

Centurion (2010)
Clash of the Titans (2010)
Iron Man 2 (2010)
Nanny McPhee and the Big Bang (2010)
Robin Hood (2010)
Captain America: The First Avenger (2011)
Hugo (2011)
Jane Eyre (2011)
Sherlock Holmes: A Game of Shadows (2011)
Anna Karenina (2012)
John Carter (2012)
47 Ronin (2013)
Fast & Furious 6 (2013)
Gravity (2013)
World War Z (2013)
Jack the Giant Slayer (2013)
Thor: The Dark World (2013)
Guardians of the Galaxy (2014)
Into the Woods (2014)
Paddington (2014)
Avengers: Age of Ultron (2015)
The Lady in the Van (2015)
Mr. Holmes (2015)
Victor Frankenstein (2015)
Alice Through the Looking Glass (2016)
Doctor Strange (2016)
Patient Zero (2016)
Pride and Prejudice and Zombies (2016)
Beauty and the Beast (2017)
Life (2017)
The Sense of an Ending (2017)
Christopher Robin (2018)
Holmes & Watson (2018)
The Hustle (2018)
Mamma Mia! Here We Go Again (2018)
Mary Poppins Returns (2018)
The Nutcracker and the Four Realms (2019)
Detective Pikachu (2019)
Downton Abbey (2019)
Dumbo (2019)
Fighting with My Family (2019)
The Good Liar (2019)
Fast & Furious Presents: Hobbs & Shaw (2019)
Rocketman (2019)
1917 (2019)

2020s
Dolittle (2020)
The Old Guard (2020)
The Midnight Sky (2020)
Cruella (2021)
The Bubble (2022)
Matilda the Musical (2022)
Enola Holmes 2 (2022)
Heart of Stone (2023)

Selected television credits

8 Out of 10 Cats (2014)
Anatomy of a Scandal (2022)
Big Ticket (1998)
The Crystal Maze (1990)
Dancing on Ice (2011)
Rebecca (1997)
Red Dwarf (1991–1999; 2009; 2012)
Russell Howard's Good News (2014)
Thomas & Friends (1986–2008) (Series 2-12)
TUGS (1989)
Gladiators (2008–2009)
You Bet! (1988–1997)
The Vicar of Dibley (1994–2000)
Last of the Summer Wine (1990–2010)
1899 (2022)
The Sandman (2022)

References

External links
 Shepperton Studios
 The Pinewood Studios Group
 Official history 
 Shepperton Studios Biography

British film studios
Film production companies of the United Kingdom
 
Buildings and structures in Surrey
Television studios in England
Companies based in Surrey
Borough of Spelthorne
Best Sound Mixing Academy Award winners
British companies established in 1931
Entertainment companies established in 1931
Mass media companies established in 1931
1931 establishments in England
1984 mergers and acquisitions
2001 mergers and acquisitions
BAFTA Outstanding British Contribution to Cinema Award